Åke Andersson may refer to:

 Åke Andersson (footballer, born 1917) (1917–1983), Swedish footballer
 Åke Andersson (footballer, born 1906) (1906–1982), Swedish footballer
 Åke Andersson (ice hockey) (1918–1982), Swedish ice hockey player
 Åke Andersson (athlete) (1925–2005), Swedish long-distance runner
 Åke Andersson (orienteering) (born 1921), Swedish orienteerer and sports leader
 Åke Andersson (rally driver), Swedish rally driver
 Åke Andersson (speedway rider) (born 1936), Swedish speedway international